Airliner shootdown incidents have occurred since at least the 1930s, either intentionally or by accident. This chronological list shows instances of airliners being brought down by gunfire or missile attacksincluding during wartimerather than by terrorist bombings or sabotage of an airplane.

1930s

Kweilin incident

This incident is believed to be the first commercial passenger plane attacked by hostile forces.  On 24 August 1938 – during the Second Sino-Japanese War – the Kweilin, a DC-2 jointly operated by China National Aviation Corporation (CNAC) and Pan American World Airways, carrying 18 passengers and crew, was forced down by Japanese aircraft in Chinese territory just north of Hong Kong. 15 people died when the Kweilin, which made an emergency water landing to avoid the attack, was strafed by the Japanese and sunk in a river. The American pilot Hugh L. Woods and two others survived. Three prominent Chinese bankers, Hu Yun, Singloh Hsu, and Wang Yumei, were among the dead. It was later believed to be an assassination attempt on Chinese president Sun Yat-sen's only son, Sun Fo, who was believed by the Japanese to be aboard but missed the flight. The plane was refurbished, renamed the Chungking, and was later involved in a second shootdown incident, in 1940.

1940s

Kaleva

The Kaleva (registered OH-ALL) was a civilian Junkers Ju 52-3/mge passenger aircraft operated by Finnish carrier Aero O/Y which was shot down by two Soviet Ilyushin DB-3 bombers on 14 June 1940, over the Baltic Sea while en route from Tallinn, Estonia to Helsinki, Finland.  This occurred during the Interim Peace between Finland and the Soviet Union, three months after the end of the Winter War, and a year before the Continuation War began. A few minutes after taking off in Tallinn, the Kaleva was intercepted by Soviet DB-3s. The bombers opened fire with their machine guns and badly damaged the Kaleva, causing it to ditch into seawater in the Gulf of Finland, a few kilometers northeast of Keri lighthouse. All seven passengers and two crew members on board died.

The Chungking

On 29 October 1940, the same DC-2 involved in the previous shootdown incident as Kweilin, now renamed Chungking, operated by CNAC, was destroyed by Japanese fighters at Changyi Airfield, Yunnan, China, after it made a scheduled landing and was coming to a stop. Nine people died, including the American pilot Walter "Foxie" Kent and Chinese architect Chang-Kan Chien. The plane caught fire and never flew again.

La Verrier 
La Verrier, an Air France SNCAC NC.223.4 mail plane, disappeared on the first leg of a flight from Marseille to Damascus with stopovers in Bizerte and Beirut on November 24, 1940. All 7 on board, including Jean Chiappe, are presumed to have died. No wreckage has been recovered, the plane radioed they were hit by machine-gun fire before disappearing; it has been theorized they were shot down in the nearby Battle of Cape Spartivento that occurred on the same day.

1942 Qantas Short Empire

The Corio, a Short Empire flying boat airliner, operated by Qantas, was shot down by Imperial Japanese Naval Air Service aircraft in the early days of the Pacific War during World War II off the coast of West Timor, Dutch East Indies, on 30 January 1942. Thirteen occupants were killed. Captain Aubrey Koch, along with another crewman and three passengers, swam to shore and were rescued.

KNILM PK-AFV

PK-AFV, also known as the PH-ALP Pelikaan (one of the KLM airliners that diverted during the German invasion of the Netherlands), was a Douglas DC-3 airliner operated by KNILM from 1940. On 3 March 1942, while on a flight from Bandung, Netherlands East Indies, to Broome, Australia, with the well-known KLM captain Ivan Smirnov, the plane was attacked by three Japanese Mitsubishi A6M Zero fighter planes; PK-AFV successfully landed on the beach near Broome with damage and an engine fire but was then strafed and the flight engineer and three passengers (including a baby) were killed. Smirnov had a consignment of diamonds, worth at the time an estimated £150,000–300,000 (in  an approximate £– million), in his possession. The vast majority of these were lost or stolen following the crash.

Air France F-AREJ 
F-AREJ, an Air France Lioré-et-Olivier H.246.1, was attacked by RAF Hawker Hurricanes on a passenger flight from Marseille to Algiers on August 13, 1942. The damaged aircraft managed to arrive at Algiers harbor but sank after landing. 4 passengers were killed.

BOAC G-AGEJ 
G-AGEJ, a BOAC Lockheed 18-40 Lodestar, was shot down by a Junkers Ju-88 of Luftwaffe 10/NJG 3 piloted by lieutenant Werner Speidel on April 4, 1943, 50 kilometers (31.3 miles) NW of Skagen, on a passenger flight from Stockholm to Saint Andrews. All 7 on board were killed.

BOAC Flight 777

BOAC Flight 777 was a scheduled civilian flight from Portela Airport, Lisbon in neutral Portugal bound for Bristol (Whitchurch) Airport, United Kingdom. The Douglas DC-3 operating the route (registered G-AGBB, ex-PH-ALI Ibis) had fled the German invasion of the Netherlands, and was owned and operated by KLM with a Dutch crew, albeit with British Overseas Airways Corporation flight numbers.  On 1 June 1943, Ibis was attacked by eight German Junkers Ju 88 fighter bombers, who were not aware of the existence of the scheduled flight and the civilian status of the aircraft. Ibis crashed into the Bay of Biscay killing all aboard, including English actor Leslie Howard.

AB Aerotransport SE-BAG Gripen
The Gripen (registered SE-BAG) was a Douglas DC-3 which was attacked by a German Junkers Ju 88  fighter-bomber over the coast of Hållö Island, Sweden on 22 October 1943 while flying a scheduled passenger flight from Aberdeen to Stockholm.
A ditching at sea was attempted but the aircraft flew against the cliffs and crashed. Of the fifteen occupants, two survived, the flight-engineer and a passenger, after they were thrown out of the rear part of the aircraft.

1950s

Cathay Pacific Douglas DC-4 shootdown

VR-HEU, a Douglas C-54 Skymaster airliner operated by Cathay Pacific Airways en route from Bangkok to Hong Kong on 23 July 1954, was shot down by People's Liberation Army Air Force Lavochkin La-11 fighters off the coast of Hainan Island; 10 of the 19 on board died.

El Al Flight 402

El Al Flight 402, a  Lockheed L-049 Constellation (registered 4X-AKC), was a passenger flight from Vienna, Austria, to Tel Aviv, Israel, via Istanbul, Turkey, on 27 July 1955. The aircraft strayed into Bulgarian airspace, refused to land, and was shot down by two Bulgarian Air Force MiG-15 fighters several kilometers away from the Greek border near Petrich, Bulgaria. All 7 crew and 51 passengers on board the airliner died.

1960s

1962: Aeroflot Flight 902

Aeroflot Flight 902 was a Tupolev Tu-104 flight on scheduled domestic service from Khabarovsk to Moscow. There were no survivors. An entry hole, with signs of fire damage on the cabin side of the fuselage, was consistent with that which could be caused by an anti-aircraft missile, and there was an unofficial confirmation that an anti-aircraft missile had gone astray during an air defense exercise in the area.

The Gujarat Beechcraft incident was an event during the Indo-Pakistani War of 1965. https://www.bbc.com/news/world-south-asia-14481483. https://eurasiantimes.com/why-did-pakistani-air-force-jet-shoot-down-indian-civilian-aircraft-in-1965-indo-pak-war/

1970s

1973: Libyan Arab Airlines Flight 114

Libyan Airlines Flight 114 was a regularly scheduled flight from Tripoli, Libya, via Benghazi to Cairo. At 10:30 on 21 February 1973, the Boeing 727 operating the flight left Tripoli, but became lost due to a combination of bad weather and equipment failure over northern Egypt around 13:44 (local time). It entered Israeli-controlled airspace over the Sinai Peninsula, where was intercepted by two Israeli Air Force McDonnell Douglas F-4 Phantom II fighters, refused to land, and was shot down. Of the 113 people on board, five survived, including the co-pilot.

1975: Malév Flight 240

Malév Flight 240 was a scheduled flight from Budapest Ferihegy International Airport, Hungary, to Beirut International Airport, Lebanon. On 30 September 1975, the aircraft operating the route, a Tupolev Tu-154 of Malév Hungarian Airlines, on its final approach for landing, crashed into the Mediterranean Sea just off the coast of Lebanon. All fifty passengers and ten crew on board were killed. No official investigation has ever been conducted on the crash by the Hungarian authorities. The aircraft was allegedly shot down during final approach, probably due to its assumed involvement in the Lebanese Civil War.

1978: Korean Air Lines Flight 902

Korean Air Lines Flight 902 was scheduled flight from Paris, France bound for Seoul, South Korea with a stopover at Anchorage, Alaska operated by a civilian Boeing 707 airliner (registered HL7429) that was shot down by Soviet Air Force Sukhoi Su-15 fighters on 20 April 1978 near Murmansk, Soviet Union after it violated Soviet airspace and failed to respond to Soviet interceptors. Two passengers died in the incident. 107 passengers and crew survived after the plane made an emergency landing on a frozen lake.

1978: Air Rhodesia Flight 825

Air Rhodesia Flight 825 was a scheduled flight between Kariba and Salisbury, Rhodesia (now Harare, Zimbabwe), that was shot down on 3 September 1978, by Zimbabwe People's Revolutionary Army (ZIPRA) guerrillas using a Soviet-manufactured Strela 2 missile. Eighteen of the 56 passengers of the Vickers Viscount survived the crash, but 10 of the survivors were killed by the guerrillas at the crash site.

1979: Air Rhodesia Flight 827

Air Rhodesia Flight 827 was a scheduled flight between Kariba and Salisbury that was shot down on 12 February 1979, by ZIPRA guerrillas using a Soviet-manufactured Strela 2 missile in similar circumstances to Flight RH825 five months earlier. None of the 59 passengers or crew of the Vickers Viscount survived.

1980s

1980: Itavia Flight 870 

On 27 June 1980 a McDonnell Douglas DC-9-15 operated by Itavia broke up mid-air and crashed into the sea near the Tyrrhenian Sea island of Ustica, while en route from Bologna to Palermo, Italy. All 81 people on board were killed. The cause has been the subject of a decades-long controversy. The aircraft may have been accidentally shot down during a military operation possibly involving United States, French, Italian and Libyan military aircraft. Another theory is that the plane was bombed by terrorists. On 23 January 2013, Italy's top criminal court ruled that there was "abundantly" clear evidence that the flight was brought down by a missile, but the perpetrators are still missing.

1980: Linhas Aéreas de Angola Yakovlev Yak-40
On 8 June 1980 Linhas Aéreas de Angola airliner (registered D2-TYC), a Yakovlev Yak-40, was shot down near Matala, Angola with the loss of all on board (4 crew and 15 passengers). ICAO reported that a "sudden situation took place in response to actions by a foreign aircraft and accidentally the Yak-40 was hit and crashed". Unconfirmed reports mention the possible involvement of a Zambian Shenyang J-6 fighter.

1981: Ram attack on TAR Canadair CL-44 

On 18 July 1981 Transporte Aéreo Rioplatense's Canadair CL-44 commercial cargo aircraft involved in the clandestine weapons supplies under the Iran-Contra affair was taken down by a Soviet Airforce Su-15 by a ram attack. The Argentinian airliner that returned from Tehran to Larnaca, Cyprus was supposed to fly in Turkish airspace along the Soviet border but deviated and appeared over Soviet Armenia. After the pilot of a Su-15 interceptor failed to force the Canadair CL-44 to land in the USSR, and realizing that the intruder was escaping,  the pilot hit the Canadair's tail causing both planes to crash near Erevan. The Soviet pilot ejected but the TAR crew died.

1983: Korean Air Lines Flight 007

Korean Air Lines Flight 007 was a Korean Air Lines Boeing 747 civilian airliner shot down by a Soviet Air Force Sukhoi Su-15TM interceptor on 1 September 1983, near Moneron Island just west of Sakhalin Island, after it strayed into Soviet airspace. 269 passengers and crew, including US congressman Larry McDonald, were aboard KAL 007; there were no survivors. An official investigation concluded that the course deviation was likely caused by pilot error in configuring the air navigation system.

1985: Polar 3

On 24 February 1985, the Polar 3, a Dornier 228 research airplane of the Alfred Wegener Institute in Bremerhaven, West Germany, was shot down by guerrillas of the Polisario Front over West Sahara. All three crew members died. Polar 3 was on its way back from Antarctica and had taken off in Dakar, Senegal, to reach Arrecife, Canary Islands.

1985: Bakhtar Afghan Airlines Antonov An-26, Afghanistan

On 4 September 1985 (during the Soviet–Afghan War), a Bakhtar Afghan Airlines Antonov An-26 (registered YA-BAM) was shot down by a surface-to-air missile near Kandahar, Afghanistan. The aircraft was carrying 47 passengers and 5 crew members and had been on a scheduled flight from Kandahar to Farah. There were no survivors.

1985: Aeroflot Antonov An-12 shoot-down, Angola

On November 25 1985, in Angola during the Angolan Civil War, an Aeroflot Antonov An-12 is shot down by a surface-to-air missile, while operating a cargo flight from Cuito Cuanavale to Luanda, allegedly by South African Special Forces; all 21 people on board are killed.

1987: Bakhtar Afghan Airlines Antonov An-26, Afghanistan
On 11 June 1987, a Bakhtar Afghan Airlines Antonov An-26 (registered YA-BAL) was shot down by a missile near Khost, killing 53 out of the 55 people on board. The aircraft had been on a flight from Kandahar to Kabul.

1987: Zimex Aviation Lockheed L-100, Angola
On 14 October 1987, a Lockheed L-100 Hercules (registered HB-ILF), owned by the Swiss company Zimex Aviation and operated on behalf of the International Committee of the Red Cross (ICRC), was shot down about four minutes after departing Cuito airport, Angola. It was hit by an unknown projectile fired by unknown combatants during the Angolan Civil War. Four crew members and two passengers died. On the ground, two persons died and one was severely injured.

1987: Air Malawi 7Q-YMB
On 6 November 1987, an Air Malawi Shorts Skyvan (registered 7Q-YMB) was shot down while on a domestic flight from Blantyre, Malawi to Lilongwe. The flight plan took it over Mozambique where the Mozambican Civil War was in progress. The aircraft was shot down near the Mozambican town of Ulongwe. The eight passengers and two crew on board died.

1988: Iran Air Flight 655

Iran Air Flight 655 was a commercial flight operated by Iran Air that regularly flew from Bandar Abbas, Iran to Dubai, UAE. On 3 July 1988 the aircraft was shot down by the U.S. Navy guided missile cruiser USS Vincennes which fired a RIM-66 Standard surface-to-air missile. The airplane was destroyed between Bandar Abbas and Dubai; all 290 passengers and crew died, including 66 children. USS Vincennes was in Iranian waters at the time of the attack. IR655, an Airbus A300 on an ascending flight path, was mistaken by Vincennes as a descending Iranian Grumman F-14 Tomcat.

1988: Ariana Afghan Airlines Shootdown
On 19 November 1988, an Antonov An-26 operated by Ariana Afghan Airlines was flying from Kabul, Afghanistan to Jalalabad, Afghanistan when the pilot became lost due to a technical issue. The aircraft entered Pakistani airspace when the pilot asked for help from a nearby airport in Pakistan. It was subsequently shot down by ground fire from the Pakistan Air Force near Parachinar, Pakistan resulting in 30 deaths. Ministry of Defence of Pakistan claimed that the aircraft was shot down by ground fire when it entered Pakistani territory and failed to identify itself.

1988: T&G Aviation DC-7
On 8 December 1988 a Douglas DC-7 chartered by the US Agency for International Development was shot down over Western Sahara by the Polisario Front, resulting in five deaths. Leaders of the movement said the plane was mistaken for a Moroccan Lockheed C-130. The aircraft was bound for Morocco for a locust control mission. A second aircraft was also hit, but managed to land at Sidi Ifni, Morocco.

1990s

1992: Shooting of Armenian plane by the Azerbaijan military 
A Yak-40 plane traveling from Stepanakert airport to Yerevan on 27 March 1992, with a total of 34 passengers and crew, was attacked by an Azerbaijani Air Force Sukhoi Su-25 attack aircraft. With an engine failure and a fire in rear of the plane, it eventually made a safe landing on Armenian territory.

1993: Transair Georgian Airline shootdowns

In September 1993, two airliners belonging to Transair Georgia and a third belong to Orbi Georgia were shot down by missiles and gunfire in Sukhumi, Abkhazia, Georgia. The first, a Tupolev Tu-134, was shot down on 21 September 1993 by a missile during landing approach. The second plane, a Tupolev Tu-154, was shot down a day later also during approach. A third one was shelled and destroyed on the ground, while passengers were boarding.

1994: Rwandan presidential airliner

The Dassault Falcon 50 airplane carrying Rwandan president Juvénal Habyarimana and Burundian president Cyprien Ntaryamira was shot down by surface-to-air-missiles as it prepared to land in Kigali, Rwanda, on 6 April 1994. Both presidents died. This double assassination was the catalyst for the Rwandan genocide and the First Congo War. Responsibility for the attack is disputed, with most theories proposing as suspects either the rebel Rwandan Patriotic Front (RPF) or government-aligned Hutu Power extremists opposed to negotiation with the RPF.

1998: Lionair Flight 602

Lionair Flight 602, operated by an Antonov An-24RV, crashed into the sea off the north-western coast of Sri Lanka on 29 September 1998. The aircraft departed Jaffna-Palaly Air Force Base on a flight to Colombo and disappeared from radar screens just after the pilot had reported depressurization. Initial reports indicated that the plane had been shot down by Liberation Tigers of Tamil Eelam rebels with a missile. All 7 crew and 48 passengers died.

2000s

2001: Peru shootdown

On 20 April 2001, a Cessna A185E floatplane (registered OB-1408) was shot down by a Peruvian Cessna A-37B Dragonfly attack aircraft over the border Mariscal Ramón Castilla Province of Peru. Two out of four passengers on board were killed, American Christian missionary Roni Bowers and her infant daughter Charity, while the pilot Kevin Donaldson was severely wounded. The incident took place during the Air Bridge Denial Program, where the floatplane was spotted by a CIA surveillance aircraft, who requested that the Peruvian Air Force follow the floatplane and force it to land at Iquitos to be searched for illegal drugs. After failing to contact the floatplane due to the message being sent on the wrong frequency, the CIA observers advised against a shootdown due to the floatplane not matching the expected behavior seen in  drug trafficking aircraft, only for the Peruvian Dragonfly to open fire, downing the floatplane.
A year later, the US government paid compensation of $8 million to the Bowers family and the pilot.

2001: Siberia Airlines Flight 1812

On 4 October 2001, Siberian Airlines Flight 1812, a Tupolev Tu-154, crashed over the Black Sea en route from Tel Aviv, Israel to Novosibirsk, Russia. Although the immediate suspicion was of a terrorist attack, American sources proved that the plane was hit by a S-200 surface-to-air missile, fired from the Crimean Peninsula during a joint Ukrainian-Russian military exercise, and this was confirmed by the Moscow-based Interstate Aviation Committee. All on board (66 passengers and 12 crew) died. The President of Ukraine Leonid Kuchma and several high commanders of the military expressed their condolences to the relatives of the victims. The Ukrainian Government paid out $200,000 in compensation to the families of every passenger and crew who died when the plane crashed; a total of $15 million in compensation for the accident.

2003: Baghdad DHL attempted shootdown incident

On 22 November 2003, an Airbus A300-200F cargo aircraft (registered OO-DLL), was struck on the left wing by a surface-to-air missile shortly after takeoff from Baghdad bound for Muharraq, Bahrain. The aircraft lost all hydraulic controls and the crew had to use engine thrust to manoeuvre. The pilots managed to return to Baghdad International Airport but lost directional control on landing, resulting in a runway excursion. All 3 people on board survived. The A300 did not fly again after the incident and was scrapped.

2007: Balad aircraft crash

On 9 January 2007, an Antonov An-26 crashed while attempting a landing at Balad Air Base in Iraq. Although poor weather is blamed by officials, witnesses claim they saw the plane being shot down, and the Islamic Army in Iraq claimed responsibility. Thirty-four of the thirty-five civilian passengers on board died.

2007: Mogadishu TransAVIAexport Airlines Il-76 crash

On 23 March 2007, a TransAVIAexport Airlines Ilyushin Il-76 airplane crashed in the outskirts of Mogadishu, Somalia, during the 2007 Battle of Mogadishu. Witnesses, including a Shabelle reporter, claim they saw the plane being shot down, and Belarus has initiated an anti-terrorist investigation, but Somalia insists the crash was accidental. All 11 Belarusian civilians on board died.

2010s

2014: Malaysia Airlines Flight 17

Malaysia Airlines Flight 17 was a regularly scheduled flight from Amsterdam Airport Schiphol, Netherlands to Kuala Lumpur International Airport, Malaysia. On 17 July 2014, the Boeing 777-200ER (registered 9M-MRD) operating the flight was hit by a Soviet-made Buk surface-to-air missile fired by pro-Russian Donetsk separatists.  All 283 passengers and 15 crew were killed, including 80 children. The Joint Investigation Team claimed the missile was operated by Russian-backed rebels near Donetsk, Ukraine during the Battle in Shakhtarsk Raion. Russian President Vladimir Putin denied accusations of Russian involvement. At the time, the shootdown was Ukraine's deadliest aviation disaster and the deadliest aviation disaster involving the Boeing 777.

2020s

2020: Ukraine International Airlines Flight 752

Ukraine International Airlines Flight 752 was a scheduled international passenger flight from Tehran to Kyiv operated by Ukraine International Airlines. On 8 January 2020, the Boeing 737-800 (registered UR-PSR) operating the route  was shot down by the Iranian Islamic Revolutionary Guard Corps (IRGC) shortly after take off from Tehran Imam Khomeini International Airport, killing all 176 people on board. After initially denying responsibility, Iran admitted on 11 January 2020 that, in the hours following the IRGC's launch of missiles against air bases used by the U.S., the plane was unintentionally targeted when the IRGC mistook it for a cruise missile launched by the U.S. in retaliation.

2020: East African Express Airways Brasilia crash

On 4 May 2020, an East African Express Airways Embraer EMB 120 Brasilia on an air charter flight carrying pandemic relief supplies crashed on approach to an airstrip in Berdale, Somalia after being fired upon by Ethiopian Ground Forces. All on board the aircraft were killed. The incident is under investigation by the Somali government.

See also

Arkia Israel Airlines Flight 582, a November 2002 flight that was the subject of an attempted shootdown with the missile missing the target
Flight Guard, an antimissile defense mechanism for civilian aircraft
List of aircraft hijackings

References

 
Shootdown